Dəmbəlov (also, Tambalau) is a village and the least populous municipality in the Masally Rayon of Azerbaijan.  It has a population of 95.

References 

Populated places in Masally District